Outrigger canoeing at the 2007 South Pacific Games was held from 4–8 September 2007 at Mulifanoua Reserve, Aggies Greys Resort in Samoa. Tahiti dominated the competition winning all ten gold medals.

Medal summary

Medal table

Men's Results

Women's Results

References

Outrigger canoeing at the Pacific Games
2007 South Pacific Games
Pacific Games